Knut Andersen (born 20 July 1927) is a Norwegian former footballer. He played in three matches for the Norway national football team from 1949 to 1961.

At club level, Andersen played for Frigg and Skeid, winning the Norwegian Cup twice with Skeid (1947 and 1958). He also played professionally for Padova in Italy from 1951 to 1953.

References

External links
 

1927 births
Living people
Norwegian footballers
Norway international footballers
Association football midfielders
Footballers from Oslo